Atul J. Butte is a biomedical informatics researcher and biotechnology entrepreneur. He is currently the Priscilla Chan and Mark Zuckerberg Distinguished Professor at the University of California, San Francisco. Since April 2015, Butte has serves as inaugural director of UCSF's Bakar Computational Health Sciences Institute.

Previously, Butte was Chief of the Division of Systems Medicine at Stanford University School of Medicine and Lucile Packard Children's Hospital where he held the position of an associate professor of pediatrics and (by courtesy) computer science and immunology & rheumatology.

Education 
Butte attended Brown University, where he studied computer science as an undergrad. As a member of the school's Program in Liberal Medical Education he was guaranteed acceptance to Brown's Alpert Medical School, where he obtained his MD in 1995.

Butte completed a residency in pediatrics and a fellowship in pediatric endocrinology, both at Children's Hospital Boston. In 2004, he completed a Ph.D. from the Harvard–MIT Division of Health Sciences and Technology, supervised by Dr. Isaac Kohane.

Career 
Butte has an h-index of over 85 and is recognized by Publons as a highly cited researcher. He has also founded two biotechnology companies (Personalis and NuMedii) and wrote one of the first books on microarray analysis, Microarrays for an Integrative Genomics.

In April 2012, Butte delivered a TEDMED talk describing his lab's development of techniques using massive amount of publicly available biomedical research data to make new discoveries without running a wet-lab and actually outsourcing experiments using assaydepot.com.

Butte lives with his wife, Gini Deshpande, a cancer biology and biotechnology entrepreneur, and daughter in Menlo Park, CA. , Deshpande was the chief executive officer of NuMedii, an artificial intelligence technology company.

Awards and honors
In 2021, Butte was elected as a Fellow of the International Society for Computational Biology.

References

External links 
 Lab homepage
 Academic profile
 Article in New York Times on Butte's research

Year of birth missing (living people)
American healthcare managers
Living people
Alpert Medical School alumni
University of California, San Francisco faculty
American pediatricians
Health informaticians
Members of the National Academy of Medicine